Paavo Leppänen (3 January 1876, Eno – 1 June 1945) was  Finnish journalist and politician. He was a Member of the Parliament of Finland from 1916 to 1918, representing the Social Democratic Party of Finland (SDP). He was imprisoned in 1918 for having sided with the Reds during the Finnish Civil War.

References

1876 births
1945 deaths
People from Joensuu
People from Kuopio Province (Grand Duchy of Finland)
Social Democratic Party of Finland politicians
Members of the Parliament of Finland (1916–17)
Members of the Parliament of Finland (1917–19)
People of the Finnish Civil War (Red side)
Prisoners and detainees of Finland